Congrua may refer to:
the plural of congruum, in mathematics, the difference of an arithmetic progression of squares
congrua portio, the lowest sum proper for the yearly income of a cleric